Beatriz Elizabeth Pirón Candelario (born February 27, 1995) is a Dominican weightlifter. She won the bronze medal in snatch at the 2011 Youth World Championships and gold at the 2011 Youth Pan American Championships. She went to the 2012 Summer Olympics ranking in the 9th place and the 2016 Summer Olympics ranking fourth.

Personal life
Her parents are Kenia Candelario and Augusto Pirón, have a daughter named Yamilka and Berlyn is the niece of the three times Pan American Games medalist Guillermina Candelario. She is a member of the Dominican Republic National Police with the rank of Corporal.

Career

2009
Pirón ranked 5th at 1st Youth World championships held in Chiang Mai, Thailand, participating in the under 44 kg, having a 54 kg lift in snatch, 64 kg in clean & jerk and a total of 118 kg.

2011
In April Pirón won three gold medals in the 2011 Youth Pan American Championship in the under 44 kg, setting two continental records in snatch with 62 kg and total 128 kg; she also lifted 76 kg in clean & jerk. She participated under the guidance of the coaches Rómula Hidalgo, Bienvenido Rodríguez. In May, she won the bronze medal in snatch with a 60 kg lift in snatch in the 44 kg division of the 2011 Youth World Championships held in Lima, Peru. She also had 76 in clean&jerk and a total of 136 kg. She was crowned in July in the National Junior Championship winning the gold medal in snatch with 80 kg and total with 146 kilograms, also winning the silver medal in clean & jerk with 66 .

The San Pedro de Macorís Hall of Fame invited Pirón in September to be one the pageant on the memorial where Tony Fernández and Tetelo Vargas were among the inductees.

2012
With a 6th place at the Pan-American Championship held in Antigua, Guatemala Pirón started the 2012 competing in the under 48 kg category with a total lifted of 158 kg. She earned the gold medal lifting 65 kg in snatch, 85 kg in clean & jerk and 150 kg in total in the National Schools Games representing the East region.

She was named along Yuderqui Contreras to represent the Dominican Republic at the London Olympic Games, practicing under the Guidance of Leonild Goncharenko. In her first Olympic, she ranked 7th in snatch and finished in 9th place at the 48 kg category of the Olympic tournament, with 90 kg in clean & jerk and 167 kg in total.

2015–2016
Pirón competed in 2015 Pan American Games and won the bronze medal being her National Police ranking being lifted to Corporal because of her medal. She won three gold medals in the 48 kg category, setting new Pan American marks with 81 kg in snatch, 97 kg in clean & jerk and a total amount of 178 kg. Pirón won two gold medals in snatch and total and a silver in clean and jerk, participating in the 53 kg category of the 2016 Pan American Championships. She took part of the 2016 Summer Olympics in Rio de Janeiro, finishing in the fourth place in the 48 kg category lifting 85 kg in snatch, 102 kg in clean and jerk and a total of 187 kg, just one kilo under the bronze medal.

2021

She represented the Dominican Republic at the 2020 Summer Olympics in Tokyo, Japan. She finished in 8th place in the women's 49 kg event.

Major results

Notes

References

External links
 
 
 

1995 births
Living people
Olympic weightlifters of the Dominican Republic
Weightlifters at the 2012 Summer Olympics
Weightlifters at the 2016 Summer Olympics
Sportspeople from San Pedro de Macorís
Dominican Republic female weightlifters
Weightlifters at the 2015 Pan American Games
Pan American Games bronze medalists for the Dominican Republic
Pan American Games medalists in weightlifting
Central American and Caribbean Games gold medalists for the Dominican Republic
Central American and Caribbean Games silver medalists for the Dominican Republic
Universiade medalists in weightlifting
Competitors at the 2014 Central American and Caribbean Games
Universiade medalists for the Dominican Republic
Weightlifters at the 2019 Pan American Games
Central American and Caribbean Games medalists in weightlifting
Medalists at the 2015 Pan American Games
Medalists at the 2019 Pan American Games
Weightlifters at the 2020 Summer Olympics